Cheung Prey may refer to:

Cheung Prey District, a district in Kampong Cham Province, Cambodia
Cheung Prey Commune, a commune in Batheay District of Kampong Cham Province, Cambodia